The RAKAA Professional League is the First Division in Saudi Arabia.

At the end of the 2012–13 season the league was called Saudi First Division, but the league has been renamed to RAKAA Professional League and the name stands for a Holding provider called RAKAA which has now become an official sponsor of the First Division.

Teams

League table

External links 
 Saudi Arabia Football Federation
 Saudi League Statistics
 goalzz

Saudi First Division League seasons
Saudi First Division
2012–13 in Saudi Arabian football